Li Chen (born September 1963) is a Chinese diplomat. He previously served as the Chinese Ambassador to Qatar and the Chinese Ambassador to Bahrain.

References

1963 births
Living people
Ambassadors of China to Bahrain
Ambassadors of China to Qatar